Sullah may refer to

 Sullah (Pakistan), a village in Gujrat District, Punjab
 Sullah (village) in Palampur tehsil in Kangra district of Himachal Pradesh State, India
 Sullah Upazila in Bangladesh

See also
 Sulla (disambiguation)